Margaret Rockefeller Strong (1897–1985) was an American heiress.

She was the daughter of Elizabeth "Bessie" Rockefeller (1866–1906) and Dr. Charles Augustus Strong (1862–1940). Her maternal grandfather was Standard Oil co-founder John D. Rockefeller (1839–1937). She married Chilean ballet businessman George de Cuevas on August 3, 1927; they had two children. After his death, she married Raymundo de Larraín Valdés (1935–1988) in 1977.

Margaret saved a row of Neo-Federal townhouses on Park Avenue designed by McKim, Mead & White from destruction by purchasing the property and giving one of the townhouses to the Queen Sofía Spanish Institute in 1965. She then donated the corner townhouse to her cousin, David Rockefeller, who there founded the Center for Inter-American Relations, now the Americas Society. In December 1979, Margaret donated her father's estate, Villa Le Balze in Fiesole, Tuscany, Italy to Georgetown University which operates an overseas campus there.

Her life can be read at "El Inútil de la Familia", a book written by Jorge Edwards, a Chilean writer.

Children
Elisabeth Strong Cuevas
John de Cuevas

References

1897 births
1985 deaths
Rockefeller family